, 

Nakło Śląskie  is a village in the administrative district of Gmina Świerklaniec, within Tarnowskie Góry County, Silesian Voivodeship, in southern Poland.

The village has a population of 4,100.

References

Villages in Tarnowskie Góry County